Route 388 is a short provincial highway in the Abitibi-Témiscamingue region of the Canadian province of Quebec.

Approximately 25 kilometres long, the highway is located in the Abitibi-Ouest MRC. It is essentially a continuation of Highway 101 in Ontario, extending from the provincial border to Route 393 just outside Duparquet.

Towns along Route 388

 Rapide-Danseur

See also
 List of Quebec provincial highways

References

External links 
 Provincial Route Map (Courtesy of the Quebec Ministry of Transportation) 
 Route 388 on Google Maps

388